Super Chief: The Life and Legacy of Earl Warren is a 1989 American documentary film directed by Bill Jersey and Judith Leonard about
controversial Chief Justice Earl Warren.

Cast
Gregory Peck as narrator
Robert Bork
William Brennan
Thurgood Marshall
Arthur Miller

Accolades
It was nominated for an Academy Award for Best Documentary Feature.

See also
Brown vs. Board of Education of Topeka 
Dwight D. Eisenhower
Internment of Japanese Americans

References

External links

Excerpt from the film
AllMovie

1989 films
American documentary films
Documentary films about law in the United States
1989 documentary films
1980s English-language films
1980s American films